Google Voice Search or Search by Voice is a Google product that allows users to use Google Search by speaking on a mobile phone or computer, i.e. have the device search for data upon entering information on what to search into the device by speaking.

Initially named as Voice Action which allowed one to give speech commands to an Android phone. Once only available for the U.S. English locale – commands were later recognizable and replied to in American, British, and Indian English; Filipino, French, Italian, German, and Spanish.

In Android 4.1+ (Jelly Bean), it was merged with Google Now.

In August 2014, a new feature was added to Google Voice Search, allowing users to choose up to five languages and the app will automatically understand the spoken language.

Google Voice Search on Google.com 
On June 14, 2011, Google announced at its Inside Google Search event that it would start to roll out Voice Search on Google.com during the coming days.

Google rolled out the support, but only for the Google Chrome browser.

History
Google Voice Search was a tool from Google Labs that allowed someone to use their phone to make a Google query. After the user called (650) 623-6706, the number of Google Voice's search system, they would wait for the words Say your Search Keywords and then say the keywords. Next, they would either wait to have the page updated, or click on a link to bring up the search page the user requested. At the moment, both the demo of this service and the page have been shut down. Since the introduction of the service, products from Google, such as GOOG-411, Google Maps and Google Mobile App, have been developed to use speech recognition technology in various ways.

On October 30, 2012, Google released a new Google Search app for iOS, which featured an enhanced Google Voice Search function, similar to that of the Voice Search function found in Google's Android Jelly Bean and aimed to compete with Apple's own Siri voice assistant. The new app has been compared favorably by reviewers to Siri and The Unofficial Apple Weblog's side-by-side comparison said that Google's Voice Search on iOS is "amazingly quick and relevant, and has more depth [than Siri]".
Of note is that as of May 2016 20% of search queries on mobile devices were done through voice with the number expected to grow.

Supported languages
The following languages and variants are partially supported in Google Voice Search:
 Abaza since 2021
 Afrikaans since 2010
 Albanian since 2020
 Amharic since 2017
 Arabic since 2006
 Armenian since 2017
 Azerbaijani since 2017
 Basque since 2012
 Bangla since 2017
 Bulgarian since 2012
 Burmese since 2018
 Catalan since 2012
 Czech since 2010
 Danish since 2014
 Dutch since 2010
 English (Australia, Canada, India, New Zealand, South Africa, UK, US), some variants since 2008 launch
 Filipino since 2013
 Finnish since 2012
 French since 2010
 Galician since 2012
 Georgian since 2017
 German since 2010
 Greek since 2014
 Gujarati since 2017
 Hebrew since 2011
 Hindi since 2008
 Hungarian since 2012
 Icelandic since 2012
 Italian since 2010
 Indonesian since 2011
 Japanese since 2009
 Javanese since 2017
 Kannada since 2017
 Korean since 2010
 Khmer since 2017
 Kurdish since 2021
 Kyrgyz since 2022
 Lao since 2017
 Latin
 Latvian since 2017
 Lithuanian since 2015
 Luxembourgish since 2020
 Macedonian since 2020
 Mandarin Chinese (Traditional Taiwan, Simplified China, Traditional Hong Kong) since 2009
 Malay since 2011
 Malayalam since 2017
 Marathi since 2017
 Mongolian since 2020
 Myanmar (Burmese) since 2017
 Nepali since 2017
 Norwegian since 2012
 Persian since 2013
 Polish since 2010
 Pig Latin since April 1, 2011 but it was actually added and not just because of April Fools' Day, although it is not officially listed
 Portuguese (Brazilian; European since 2012)
 Punjabi since 2020
 Romanian since 2012
 Russian since 2010
 Serbian since 2012
 Sindhi since 2021
 Sinhala since 2017
 Slovak since 2012
 Spanish (Argentina, Bolivia, Chile, Colombia, Costa Rica, Dominican Republic, Ecuador, El Salvador, Guatemala, Honduras, Mexico, Nicaragua, Panama, Paraguay, Peru, Puerto Rico, Spain, US, Uruguay, Venezuela) since 2010 and Latin American Spanish since 2011
 Sundanese since 2017
 Swahili since 2017
 Swedish since 2012
 Tamil since 2017
 Telugu since 2017
 Turkish since 2010
 Urdu since 2017
 Uzbek since 2018
 Yue Chinese (Traditional Hong Kong) since 2010
 Zulu since 2010
 Vietnamese since 2015

Integration in other Google products

Google Maps with voice search 
In the summer of 2008, Google added voice search to the BlackBerry Pearl version of Google Maps for mobile, allowing Pearl users to say their searches in addition to typing them. See http://www.google.com/mobile/blackberry/maps.html for more information.

Google Mobile App with voice search 
The Google Mobile app for Blackberry and Nokia (Symbian) mobiles allows users to search Google by voice at them touch of a button by speaking their queries. See http://www.google.com/mobile/apple/app.html for more information. Google also introduced voice search to all "Google Experience" Android phones with the 1.1 platform update, which includes the functionality on board the built-in Google Search widget.

In November 2008, Google added voice search to Google Mobile App on iPhone. With a later update, Google announced Voice Search for iPod touch. It requires a third party microphone.
On August 5, 2009, T-Mobile launched the MyTouch 3G with Google, which features one-touch Google Voice Search.

Google Voice Search in YouTube 
Since March 2010, a beta-grade derivation of Google Voice Search is used on YouTube to provide optional automatic text caption annotations of videos in the case that annotations are not provided. This feature is geared to the hearing-impaired and, at present, is only available for use by English-speaking users.

See also 
 Microsoft Cortana
 Siri

References

External links
 

Voice Search
Voice over IP
2002 software
Computer-related introductions in 2002